The 1996 Appalachian State Mountaineers football team was an American football team that represented Appalachian State University as a member of the Southern Conference (SoCon) during the 1996 NCAA Division I-AA football season. In their eighth year under head coach Jerry Moore, the Mountaineers compiled an overall record of 7–4, with a conference mark of 5–3.

Schedule

References

Appalachian State
Appalachian State Mountaineers football seasons
Appalachian State Mountaineers football